Morgenstern may refer to:

People with the surname
 Alisher Morgenshtern (born 1998), Russian rapper and YouTuber
 Barbara Morgenstern (born 1971), German musician
 Christian Morgenstern (1871–1914), German poet
 Christian Ernst Bernhard Morgenstern, German landscape painter
 Dan Morgenstern, music critic, former editor of Down Beat magazine, academician at Rutgers University
 Erin Morgenstern, American author
 Hal Morgenstern, American epidemiologist
 Ignace Morgenstern (1900–1961), Hungarian-born French film producer
 Janusz Morgenstern (1922–2011), Polish film director and producer.
 Joe Morgenstern, American film critic
 Johann Karl Simon Morgenstern (1770–1852), the German philologist who coined the term Bildungsroman
 Julian Morgenstern (1881–1976), American rabbi and Hebrew Union College professor and president
 Maia Morgenstern (born 1962), Romanian film and stage actress
 Mark Morgenstern, Canadian filmmaker
 Matthew Morgenstern, Israeli professor
 Oskar Morgenstern (1902–1977), German-born economist and founder of the field of game theory
 Ralph Morgenstern, German actor in theatre, TV and film
 Soma Morgenstern (1890–1976), Jewish-Austrian writer and journalist
 Stephanie Morgenstern, Canadian actress and screenwriter
 Thomas Morgenstern (born 1986), Austrian ski jumper

Fiction
 David Morgenstern, a fictional emergency department physician portrayed by William H. Macy on the TV series ER
 S. Morgenstern, fictional author of William Goldman's The Princess Bride
 Valentine Morgenstern and Sebastian Morgenstern, the main antagonists in Mortal Instruments book series
 Clary Fray, the main protagonist of the Mortal Instruments book series, has the paternal surname of Morgenstern
 Rhoda Morgenstern, portrayed by Valerie Harper, a character on the television sitcom The Mary Tyler Moore Show and subsequent spin-off Rhoda
 Marjorie Morningstar (novel), 1955 novel by Herman Wouk, which introduced the character Marjorie Morgenstern
 Marjorie Morningstar (film) (1958), title character portrayed by Natalie Wood
 Ava Morgenstern, portrayed by Ava Kolker, a character in Disney's children show Girl Meets World

Music
 Morgenshtern (born 1998), Russian hip-hop musician
 Morgenstern (band), a music project
 Morgenstern, song by rock band Rammstein on their 2004 album Reise, Reise

Other uses
 Morning star (weapon), a spiked mace, also known as a morgenstern
 Morgenstern, a thermonuclear device detonated in the Castle Koon nuclear test.

See also
 Morgenster (disambiguation)
 Morning Star (disambiguation)